Dmitry Vyacheslavovich Vasilyev (born 2 May 1985) is a former Russian professional footballer.

Club career
Studied in Hajduk Split 2001-2003. Was selected in junior and youth combined teams, Shinnik, Krilya Sovetov, FC League, FC Sochi. He made his professional debut in the Russian Premier League in 2005 for FC Shinnik Yaroslavl. He played 3 games in the UEFA Intertoto Cup 2004 for FC Shinnik Yaroslavl.

He should not be confused with Dmitry Vladimirovich Vasilyev, a former Russian international who also played for FC Shinnik Yaroslavl.

Personal life
His grandfather Vasili Vasilyev played in the Soviet Top League in the 1950s for PFC Krylia Sovetov Samara and Admiralteets Leningrad and later was a manager for many clubs. His father Vyacheslav Vasilyev played in the Soviet Second League for FC Fakel Voronezh and FC Volgar Astrakhan.

References

1985 births
Sportspeople from Sochi
Living people
Russian footballers
Russia youth international footballers
Russia under-21 international footballers
Association football forwards
FC Arsenal-2 Kyiv players
FC Shinnik Yaroslavl players
PFC Krylia Sovetov Samara players
FC Anzhi Makhachkala players
FC Luch Vladivostok players
Russian Premier League players
Russian expatriate footballers
Expatriate footballers in Croatia
Expatriate footballers in Ukraine